This is a list of electoral results for the Electoral district of Claremont in Western Australian state elections.

Members for Claremont

Election results

Elections in the 1960s

Elections in the 1950s

Elections in the 1940s

Elections in the 1930s

Elections in the 1920s

Elections in the 1910s

Elections in the 1900s

References

Western Australian state electoral results by district